The S14 is a regional railway line of the Zürich S-Bahn on the Zürcher Verkehrsverbund (ZVV), Zürich transportation network, in the canton of Zürich, Switzerland.

Route 
 

The line runs from Affoltern am Albis to Zürich Hauptbahnhof, before continuing to Hinwil, the capital of the district of Hinwil in the Zürcher Oberland. It serves the following stations:

 Affoltern am Albis
 Hedingen
 Bonstetten-Wettswil
 Birmensdorf
 Urdorf Weihermatt
 Urdorf
 Zürich Altstetten
 
 
 
 
 
 
 
 
 
 

The service uses the Altstetten–Zürich–Oerlikon cross-city line, opened in 2015 and including the Weinberg Tunnel, between Altstetten and Oerlikon.

Rolling stock 
Initially, all services were operated by Re 450 class locomotives pushing or pulling double-deck passenger carriages. RABe 514 class multiple units began displacing the push-pull sets in 2008.  all services are operated with Re 450 locomotives and double-deck coaches.

Scheduling 
The train frequency is usually 30 minutes and the trip takes 70 minutes.

History 
Originally the S14 started in the terminal platforms at Zürich Hauptbahnhof, and ran via the Wipkingen Tunnel to Oerlikon and on to Hinwil. With the completion of the Altstetten–Zürich–Oerlikon cross-city line in 2015, it was diverted at Oerlikon to use the Weinberg Tunnel and the low-level through platforms of the Hauptbahnhof, before being extended to  Affoltern am Albis to replace the S15 which was in turn diverted elsewhere. This diversion and extension means that the line no longer serves the railway stations of Wipkingen (on the original S14 route) and doesn't serve Hardbrücke (on the original S15 route).

See also 

 Rail transport in Switzerland
 Trams in Zürich

References

External links 
 
 ZVV official website: Routes & zones

Zürich S-Bahn lines
Transport in the canton of Zürich